The Wartburg Knights wrestling program is one of the most successful programs in the NCAA Division III. They are a member of the American Rivers Conference and wrestle for Wartburg College. Wartburg has an NCAA DIII leading 15 National Championships while finishing as a runner-up 10 times. They have also won 12 NWCA National Duals titles.

History 
Wartburg wrestling began in 1955. It took until 1996 when Wartburg would win their first ever National Championship.  Since then Wartburg has won an NCAA DIII leading 15 NCAA wrestling National Championships.  Since 1995 only two teams have won a DIII NCAA wrestling team title, those two being Wartburg College and Augsburg University.  Both teams have gone back and forth throughout the last 28 years which created one of the greatest rivalries in any sport. The rivalry gained national attention when it was placed front and center on the New York Times sports section in 2012. The two teams meet every year and wrestling for a belt in a dual aptly named "Battle of the Burgs", with Wartburg winning the last 8 straight and most recent in 2023.  In 2022, Wartburg would go on to win its NCAA leading 15th National Championship by beating Wabash by one single point 79-78

Home meets 
Home meets are held in the Levick Arena in Waverly, Iowa.

Championships

NCAA team championships

NWCA Team Championships
2021 (no NCAA Championship was held due to the COVID-19 Pandemic)

ARC/IIAC Conference Championships
1948, 1949, 1950, 1951, 1954, 1960, 1974, 1976, 1977, 1978, 1993, 1994, 1995, 1996, 1997, 1998, 1999, 2000, 2001, 2002, 2003, 2004, 2005, 2006, 2007, 2008, 2009, 2010, 2011, 2012, 2013, 2014, 2015, 2016, 2017, 2018, 2019, 2021, 2022, 2023

NWCA National Duals Championship
2003, 2004, 2006, 2008, 2011, 2012, 2013, 2014, 2015, 2016, 2017, 2020

NCAA Individual Champions 

The following table counts the achievements of Wartburg Knight wrestlers by name as opposed to year.

Notable Wartburg wrestlers
Punahele Soriano
LeRoy Gardner III

See also
 National Wrestling Hall of Fame and Museum

References

External links